This page gathers the results of elections in Alsace.

Regional elections

Last regional election

In the last regional election, which took place on March 21 and March 28, 2004, Adrien Zeller (UMP) was re-elected President, defeating Jacques Bigot (PS).